Rittenhouse is a surname of German origin. It may refer to:

Places
Rittenhouse (crater), a crater on the far side of the Moon

United States
Rittenhouse Elementary School, Queen Creek, Arizona; on the National Register of Historic Places
Rittenhouse Gap, Pennsylvania
Rittenhouse Square, one of the five original open-space parks in central Philadelphia, Pennsylvania
RittenhouseTown Historic District, a historic area in Philadelphia surrounding the first paper mill erected in British Colonial America
Queen Creek, Arizona, named Rittenhouse until 1947

People with the surname 

 Ariel Rittenhouse (born 1990), US female athlete in swimming and diving
 David Rittenhouse (1732–1796), US astronomer, inventor, mathematician, and public official 
 Kyle Rittenhouse (born 2003), American acquitted of murder in the 2020 Kenosha unrest shooting
 Laura Jacinta Rittenhouse (1841–1911), American temperance worker, author, poet, orphanage manager, club woman
 Moses F. Rittenhouse (1846–1915), Canadian-born US businessman
 Rebecca Rittenhouse (born November 30, 1988), American actress
 William Rittenhouse (1644–1708), German-born US businessman and papermaker

Other
SS David Rittenhouse, a ship of the US Navy, launched during World War II (1943)
Mrs. Rittenhouse, a character in Animal Crackers (1930 film)
A train operated by Amtrak as part of the Clocker service
A straight rye whiskey originally made in Pennsylvania, now produced in Kentucky by Heaven Hill
A fictional organization in the 2016 TV series Timeless